Nikola Sarić (born 6 June 1985 in Bajina Bašta) is a Serbian German painter focussing on Christian sacral art.

Life 
Sarić grew up in Bajina Bašta, Serbia and went to Belgrade in 2000 to study at the TehnoArt School, changed in 2005 to study at the University of Belgrade at the faculty of restoration and conservation, before, in 2006 starting to study at the Academy of the Serbian Orthodox Church for Art and Conservation, where he graduated in 2014. Since 2011 he lives in Hannover, Germany.

Important works (selection) 
 Les Martyrs de Libye (Paris, Petit Palais), 2018, 100 × 70 cm, water colours on paper.
Akathistos to St. Demetrius. 2009, 12 paintings, each 130 × 160  cm, acrylic on canvas.
 Parables of Christ, 2014, cycle of 20 paintings, each 30 × 30  cm, water colours on paper, mounted on wood.
 Holy Martyrs of Libya. 2015 (Eichstätt, Collegium Orientale), 100 × 70  cm, water colours on paper.
 St Chrysogonus, St Katharina, St Konrad. (Hannover, Gartenkirche St. Marien), 2015, 120 × 90  cm, egg tempera and gold leave on wood

Exhibitions (selection) 
Solo exhibitions are marked S, exhibitions with catalogues are marked C.

2009
 Свет који се не да замислити, Galerie Otklon, Belgrade (S)
2012
 Separation, konnektor – Forum für Künste, Hannover (S)
 3rd Yokogawa Charity Art Festival, Hiroshima
2014
 Demetrius – Begegnung mit dem Heiligen, Gartenkirche St. Marien, Hannover (S) (C)
 Laokoon, konnektor – Forum für Künste, Hannover (S)
2015
 18. ZINNOBER Kunstvolkslauf, Hannover
 Wie durch einen Spiegel – Biblische Ikonographie heute, Religionspädagogisches Institut, Loccum (S)
 87. Herbstausstellung, Kunstverein, Hannover (C)
 Coptic Orthodox Monastery Brenkhausen, Höxter (S)
 Савремени иконопис у Србији (Contemporary Serbian Icon Painting), Cultural Centre of Novi Sad
2016
 Ikonen und Chimera, Kunstsalon Villa Artista, Hannover (S)
 The Icon in the Context of the 21st Century, Museum of Herzegowina, Trebinje
 Satt mich sehen an deinem Bilde, Mariensee Abbey, Neustadt am Rübenberge (S) (C)
 Wildheit/Zähmung, Schloss Landestrost, Neustadt am Rübenberge
 Παραβολές και Μάρτυρες, Mount Athos Center, Thessaloniki (S) 
2017
 Zyklus des Lebens, Fonis Gallery, Düsseldorf (S) 
 Zeugen, Church of St. Augustine of Canterbury, Wiesbaden (S)
 Und das Wort ward Bild, Gartenkirche St. Marien, Hannover (S)
 Apărători ai ortodoxiei și Sfinți Martiri din vremea comunismului, Centrul Cultural Ion Manu, Otopeni/Bucharest
 Das fliegende Jackett, Fonis Gallery, Düsseldorf 

2018

 88. Herbstausstellung, Kunstverein, Hannover (C)

Du spirituel dans la peinture…, Galerie Tokonoma, Paris (S)

2019

 Quantum Music: Decoding Reality, Sprengel Museum Hannover
 Nikola Sarić: Malerei, Groß St. Martin, Köln (S)
 Der dritte Raum, Sigwardskirche Idensen, Wunstorf (S)
 Nikola Sarić: Malerei, Eisfabrik, Hannover (S)
2020

 Nikola Sarić: Reflexionen, Eichstätt Cathedral Treasury and Diocesan Museum, Eichstätt (S)
 Nikola Sarić: An Artistic and Spiritual Journey, Christopher Boïcos, Paris (S)
2021

 YES? YES!. Zukunftswerkstatt Ihme-Zentrum (S) (C)
89. Herbstausstellung, Kunstverein Hannover (C)

2022
 Nikola Sarić: Images of Revelation, Old School of Loggos, Paxos (Greece) (S)

2023
 Nikola Sarić: PowerLESS, Himmelsfahrtskirche, München
 Nikola Sarić: Kreis - unvollendet, Hildesheim Cathedral Museum

Awards 

 2021 Special Prize (Sonderpreis) awarded by Hanns-Lilje-Stiftung, Hannover

TV Appearances 

 2018 Interview by Thomas Wollut with Nikola Sarić as part of the broadcast series Les chemins de la foi on TV France 2
 2023 Television service with the participation of Nikola Sarić, the regional bishop Christian Kopp of Munich and pastor Stephanie Höhner on 6 March, broadcast live from church Himmelfahrtskirche München-Sendling by BR Fernsehen

Literature 
 François Bœspflug e Emanuela Fogliadini: Il battesimo di Cristo nell’arte, Milano 2021: Jaca Book, ISBN 9788816606562, p. 208-211.
 François Bœspflug e Emanuela Fogliadini: La risurrezione di Cristo nell’arte d’Oriente e d’Occidente, Milano 2019: Jaca Book, p. 209-212.
 François Bœspflug avec la participation de Emanuela Fogliadini: Cruxifixion - la crucifixion dans l'art, un sujet planétaire, Montrouge: Bayard 2019, p. 380–383.
 Zeugen – Gedichte von Nikola Đolović mit einigen Bildern von Nikola Sarić. In: Der schmale Pfad. volume 56. Johannes A. Wolff Verlag, Apelern 2016, p. 60–75.
 Jean-Marc Nemer: Nikola Saric, un iconographe transgressif?, master thesis at the Faculty of Fine Arts and Art History at UFR04 - Université Panthéon-Sorbonne, 2016.

External links 
 
 Literature by and about Nikola Sarić (painter) in the Royal Library of the Netherlands catalogue
 Website of the artist

 Artist's talk with Nikola Sarić and Shige Fujishiro in the series Kunstfieber Hannover, recorded on 13 October 2015 at Cumberlandsche Galerie Hannover.

References 

1985 births
Living people
20th-century German painters
20th-century German male artists
German male painters
German people of Serbian descent
Serbian painters
21st-century German painters
21st-century German male artists